Columbimorphae is a clade discovered by genome analysis that includes birds of the orders Columbiformes (pigeons and doves), Pterocliformes (sandgrouse), and Mesitornithiformes (mesites). Previous analyses had also recovered this grouping, although the exact relationships differed. Some studies indicated a sister relationship between sandgrouse and pigeons (the traditional view) while other studies favored a sister grouping of mesites and sandgrouse instead.

References

Neognathae